No Shortcuts: Organizing for Power in the New Gilded Age is a 2016 non-fiction book by Jane McAlevey. Mcalvey discusses meaningful change can only happen with organising that puts ordinary people at the center of their own struggle. She provides an analysis of power for movements and unions that don't understand their own sources of power or how to use it effectively.

A German edition was published by VSA: Verlag, a division of Springer Science+Business Media, in February 2019.

Overview
Chapters include "The Power to Win is in the Community, Not the Boardroom," "Nursing Home Unions: Class Snuggle vs. Class Struggle," "Chicago Teachers: Building a Resilient Union," "Smithfield Foods: A Huge Success You've Hardly Heard About," and "Make the Road New York." As she dissects each case, she identifies the reasons for the movement's success or failure.

Reception
The book received positive reviews from Dayna Tortorici,  and
Sam Gindin.

References

External links
 Author's Official Website

American non-fiction books
2017 non-fiction books
Oxford University Press books